The 1977 Honduran Segunda División was the eleventh season of the Honduran Segunda División.  Under the management of Roy Almendárez, C.D. Tiburones won the tournament after defeating Alianza in the final series and obtained promotion to the 1978–79 Honduran Liga Nacional.

Final

 Tiburones won 7–3 on aggregate.

References

Segunda
1977